The Lithuania men's national tennis team represents Lithuania in Davis Cup tennis competition and are governed by the Lithuanian Tennis Association.

Lithuania has never been a tennis country – no tennis player from Lithuania entered ATP top 500 until 2008. However, the situation is changing in recent years. Currently young Lithuanian players are winning the greatest tennis victories in the history of Lithuania. As expected, this led to the increasing popularity of tennis in the country. Now, Lithuania has a few very high quality players.

In 2012 Lithuania competed in the third group of Davis Cup, where they won all three ties and got promoted to the second group. It played seven times  there. Also, it has competed in the third group for 13 times. And once have been promoted to group one, where Lithuania team is currently playing.

Current Team (2015)
Player information and rankings

Other Players

 Julius Tverijonas
 Benas Majauskas

History 
Lithuania started its Davis Cup history in 1994 with competing in the Europe and Africa zone of Group III.

Present 
Lithuania started 2009 Davis Cup with their first ever victory in Group II. In the first round, Lithuania defeated Georgia 3–2 in front of a home crowd in a recently built SEB arena. All work was done by the youngest members of the Lithuanian team – 18-year-old Ričardas Berankis won both of his singles matches and 16-year-old Dovydas Šakinis defeated the leader of Georgian team Irakli Labadze in the decisive rubber. For the second round match-up, Lithuania went to Otočec to play against Slovenia. However, the Slovenian team with Grega Žemlja and Blaž Kavčič was too strong for Lithuania, which managed to win only one set in five matches, and the tie ended 0–5.

In 2010 Lithuania had its better performance. For the first round match-up Lithuania drew the top seeded British team in Lithuania. With James Ward defeating Laurynas Grigelis, Great Britain winning the doubles match and Berankis winning both of his singles matches the tie came to the decisive rubber. Grigelis won a five-setter against Daniel Evans and against all odds Lithuania celebrated a 3–2 victory over Great Britain. Lithuania's next round was against Irish team led by Conor Niland and James McGee in Dublin. Lithuania celebrated after the second day when Berankis and Grigelis won the first three matches and secured the tie. Ireland managed to win the remaining dead rubbers with Lithuania winning the tie 3–2. In the third round Lithuania had a rematch of last year's tie against Slovenia, only this time Slovenian team came to Vilnius. The best two Lithuanian tennis players Berankis and Grigelis represented Lithuania in all five matches but they managed to win only two of them – Berankis defeated Blaž Kavčič in the first rubber and Lithuania came back from two sets to love down in the doubles match. Eventually, Lithuania ended up losing 2–3 and Slovenia was promoted to the first group.

Lithuania came into the 2011 Davis Cup with high hopes but the dreams were crashed in the first round tie against Estonia in Tallinn. During the second rubber Grigelis got a knee injury and not only lost the match but also had to skip the remaining tie. Grigelis was replaced by Dovydas Šakinis who was still recovering from pneumonia so couldn't play his best tennis. Although Berankis won both of his singles matches, Lithuania lost the tie 2–3. The fourth rubber between Berankis and Jürgen Zopp took 3 hours 46 minutes and it was the longest rubber for both teams in their histories. After the first round loss Lithuania faced a relegation play-off against Morocco in Vilnius, where neither Berankis nor Grigelis helped Lithuania. The Lithuanian team, with only one ranked player and all players being under 19, lost to Morocco 0-5<ref>Lithuania vs. Morocco daviscup.com</ref> which led to the relegation to the third group for the following year.

In 2012, Lithuania was competing in Group III. In the group stage Lithuania defeated Andorra and San Marino without losing a set. For the promotion play-off Lithuania faced the Greek team. In the first rubber Grigelis lost a tough match to Theodoros Angelinos but Berankis restored the parity by defeating Paris Gemouchidis. In the decisive rubber, Lithuanian leaders won a doubles match and the tie ended 2–1. Lithuania got promoted to the Group II for the following year.

In 2013, Lithuania was drawn to play against Cyprus in the first round of the Europe/Africa Zone Group II.

In 2014 Lithuania team defeated South Africa, Norway and Bosnia and Herzegovina and was promoted to Europe/Africa Zone Group I for the first time in 2015.

 Statistics 
 Total record 45–33 (58%)

 Head-to-head record 

 0–1
 2–1
 1–0
 2–1
 1–0
 3–2
 2–0
 1–0
 0–1
 3–0
 0–3
 1–6
 1–0
 2–0
 1–0
 1–1
 1–0
 0–1
 3–0
 1–1
 2–0
 0–1
 0–1
 1–1
 2–0
 1–0
 0–1
 2–2
 1–2
 2–0
 1–0
 1–0
 0–1
 0–1
 2–0
 1–0
 0–1
 0–2
 1–0
 2–0
 2–2
 0–1

 Group record 
 Europe/Africa zone group II 4–11 (27%)
 Europe/Africa zone group III 41–22 (65%)

 Home and away record 
Group II:
 Performance in Lithuania 3–6 (33%)
 Performance away 1–5 (17%)
Group III:
 Performance in Lithuania 2–2 (50%)
 Performance away 39–20 (66%)

 Surface record 
 Carpet courts 3–5 (38%)
 Clay courts 30–23 (57%)
 Grass courts 0–0 (-%)
 Hard courts 12–5 (71%)

 Matches record 
 Singles 108–78 (58%)
 Doubles 70–80 (47%)
 Total 178–158 (53%)Statistics correct as of the end of the season in 2013. All players Data correct as of May 13, 2013.

Results

1994–1999

2000–2009

2010–

External links

References 

Davis Cup teams
Davis Cup
Davis Cup
1994 establishments in Lithuania